Karkaar is a mountain range which ranges from Somalia's northwestern border with Ethiopia, until Cape Guardafui. It is also an administrative region defined by the autonomous Puntland state. The territory occupies the south of what has traditionally been the Bari region of Somalia, and generally lies south of the Karkaar mountain range.
Qardho was place of empire.

References

Puntland
Mountain ranges of Somalia
Somali montane xeric woodlands